Tarucus legrasi, the Le Gras' Pierrot, is a butterfly in the family Lycaenidae. It is found in Senegal, Burkina Faso, northern Ivory Coast, Nigeria (north of Kano), Niger (Aïr), northern Cameroon, Chad, Sudan, northern Uganda, north-western Kenya and Somalia. The habitat consists of arid (Sahelian) savanna

The larvae feed on Ziziphus species.

References

Butterflies described in 1948
Tarucus